Raecius is a genus of African araneomorph spiders in the family Udubidae, first described by Eugène Simon in 1892.

Species
 it contains six species:
Raecius aculeatus Dahl, 1901 — Congo
Raecius asper Thorell, 1899 — Cameroon, Equatorial Guinea (Bioko)
Raecius congoensis Griswold, 2002 — Congo
Raecius crassipes L. Koch, 1875 — Ethiopia
Raecius jocquei Griswold, 2002 — Ivory Coast
Raecius scharffi Griswold, 2002 — Tanzania

References

External links

Araneomorphae genera
Udubidae